The Bahamas competed at the 1976 Summer Olympics in Montreal, Quebec, Canada. It was the first time it competed in the Olympics as an independent nation.

Athletics

Men
Track & road events

Field events

Women
Track & road events

Field events

Sailing

Open

Swimming

Men

See also
Bahamas at the 1975 Pan American Games

References
Official Olympic Reports	
sports-reference

Nations at the 1976 Summer Olympics
1976
Olympics